2022 Prime Volleyball League (also known as PVL 2022, or for sponsorship reasons, RuPay PVL 2022) is the inaugural season of the Prime Volleyball League, a franchise based Indian Indoor Volleyball League which is organized by Baseline Ventures. This edition of the league will feature seven teams from Ahmedabad, Bengaluru, Calicut, Chennai, Hyderabad, Kochi and Kolkata and the tournament is scheduled to be held at Gachibowli Indoor Stadium in Hyderabad from 5 to 27 February 2022.

Format 
Seven teams are contesting in the inaugural season. There are a total of 24 matches with each team plays against each other in a single round-robin format with the top 4 teams moving into the play-offs.

Venue 
The tournament was earlier scheduled to be held in Kochi but later moved to Hyderabad due to the COVID-19 pandemic in India.  All the matches were held at the Gachibowli Indoor Stadium in Hyderabad.

League standings 

|}
Source:

Legend:

League stage 

 |}
Source:

Play-offs

Semifinals
Top four teams of League stage are qualified to two different semifinal pairs.

Semifinal 1

 |}

Semifinal 2

 |}

Finals

Final

 |}

Final standings

Awards

Source:

References 

Volleyball competitions in India
2022 in men's volleyball